Roderick "Roddie" MacKenzie (born 22 May 1901) was a Scottish professional footballer who played as a half back.

Career
Born in Inverness, MacKenzie played for Newcastle United, making over 200 appearances in the English Football League.

References

1901 births
Year of death missing
Scottish footballers
Newcastle United F.C. players
English Football League players
Association football defenders
FA Cup Final players